Maddalena is a 1954 French-Italian melodrama film directed by Augusto Genina and starring Märta Torén, Gino Cervi and Charles Vanel. It was entered into the 1954 Cannes Film Festival. It was shot in technicolor. The film's sets were designed by the art director Ottavio Scotti.

Plot 
Every year, on Good Friday, a procession takes place in a small provincial village. This year the women of the village are unable to choose a girl who can play the Madonna. A local squire, with the intention of publicly mocking the curate Don Vincenzo, ensures that a young prostitute, Maddalena, receives this assignment.

Magdalene accepts because she wants to take revenge with the Virgin for the loss of her daughter, who died in boarding school during her first communion, due to a trivial fire of the veil. The women of the village do not accept that a foreigner interprets the Madonna, but the curate defends her choice, even though he does not know who Magdalene really is.

During a rehearsal of the procession, Magdalene faints and is invited by the priest to rest. But, passing by the church, he meets a woman in prayer who sees her and, believing that Magdalene is an apparition of the Madonna, invokes her to have her son healed from a serious illness.

Magdalene tries to escape, but she is credited with healing the boy and she stays for the Good Friday procession. The squire, however, takes revenge by telling everyone who the girl really is. Faced with this confession, people attack Maddalena and start stoning her.

Cast
 Märta Torén as Maddalena
 Gino Cervi as  Don Vincenzo
 Charles Vanel as Giovanni Lamberti
 Jacques Sernas as  Giovanni Belloni
 Folco Lulli as  The Herdsman
 Patrizia De Filippo as  Maddalena's Daughter
 Angiola Faranda as  The Herdsman's Daughter
 Valentine Tessier as Geltrude
 Isa Querio as Luisa 
 Bianca Doria as Rosa  
 Germana Paolieri as Prostitute 
 Liliana Gerace as The Other Prostitute 
 Natale Cirino as The Barman

References

External links

1954 films
French drama films
1950s Italian-language films
1954 drama films
Films directed by Augusto Genina
Films with screenplays by Pierre Bost
Titanus films
Pathé films
Italian drama films
Melodrama films
1950s Italian films
1950s French films